The Icelandic men's national ice hockey team is a member of the International Ice Hockey Federation, representing Iceland in ice hockey competitions. Iceland is ranked 33rd in the world by the IIHF World Rankings as of 2022.

IIHF World Championships

All-time record against other nations
Results updated 14 January 2018.

References

External links

IIHF profile
National Teams of Ice Hockey

Ice hockey in Iceland
National ice hockey teams in Europe
Ice Hockey